Trachinocephalus myops, also known as the blunt-nose lizardfish, is a species of fish in the family Synodontidae found in Atlantic Ocean. This species grows to a length of  TL. It has been discovered that the species has two peaks in its spawning season, from February to April and from August to October. This suggests that their reproductive activity is suitable for the different environments the species utilizes.

References

External links
 

Synodontidae
Fish of the Atlantic Ocean
Fish described in 1801